Metius circumfusus is a species of ground beetle in the subfamily Pterostichinae. It was described by Ernst Friedrich Germar in 1824.

References

circumfusus
Beetles described in 1824